Rachael Robertson is an Australian author and keynote speaker. She is an authority on leading in extreme environments. Robertson is a former Antarctic Expedition Leader, who led the 58th Australian National Antarctic Research Expedition (ANARE) to Davis Station in 2005. She based her work of speaking, writing and mentoring on the leadership lessons she learned in Antarctica.

Personal life 

Robertson was born in Geelong, Victoria, Australia to Sharon and Lawrence Robertson and grew up as the oldest child with a younger brother and sister. She spent the majority of her pre-adult life living in the South Eastern suburbs of Melbourne. Robertson now resides in Melbourne with her husband and child.

Early career 

Robertson graduated from Deakin University with a Bachelor of Arts majoring in Public Relations and commenced a career in Public Relations with Melbourne Parks and Waterways. She moved out of PR and into the operational role of Park Ranger – Customer Services with the newly created Parks Victoria. Over 14 years, Robertson successively moved into more senior roles. At the time of leaving for Antarctica she was Chief Ranger of Victoria's South West Region.

She holds an MBA from Melbourne Business School.

Antarctica 

Robertson led the 120 scientists and tradespeople in Davis station over the Antarctic summer (December 2004 to February 2005). She then led and managed the 17 other people who remained behind at Davis Station to maintain the operation until the scientists and tradespeople returned in November 2005. In "Leading on the Edge", she recounts the wide disparity between Antarctic life in summer, and Antarctic life in winter.

Robertson quoted, "the repetitive monotony of the day-to-day work and the same old faces at breakfast, lunch and dinner create a nine-month-long 'groundhog day' experience".

Robertson's leadership ideas 
Robertson earned an MBA when she returned from Antarctica. She developed leadership frameworks based on her Antarctic experience. These frameworks include:
 Bacon Wars   – A framework for understanding which of the small things that irritate people has the potential to become a larger problem and what to do about it. 
 No Triangles   – A framework to enable people to have difficult conversations directly with the individual concerned, rather than "rope in" a third party.
 The Plane Crash  – Four pillars of effective Crisis Leadership
 Respect Trumps Harmony – Why it's more important to show respect for each individual than it is to seek out harmony in a team
 Lead without a title – A tool to help individual show leadership in their current position, regardless of their official title.

Works 

As of September 2017, Robertson has delivered more than 1000 keynote sessions to organisations and associations across the US, Australia, New Zealand and Asia. The clients she works with range from large global organisations, such as Randstad, to local fundraising events such as Day of Inspiration.

Charitable work 
Rachael is an Australia Day ambassador and is a media-spokesperson for RUOK? Day.

Sponsorships 
In 2019, Rachael was sponsored by outdoor clothing company Yarra Trail as one of their three "Trailblazers" for the Autumn fashion season.

Notes

References

External links 
 

1969 births
Australian motivational speakers
Australian businesspeople
People from Geelong
Writers from Melbourne
Living people
Deakin University alumni
University of Melbourne alumni